Hanzhong Road is the name of an interchange station between Line 1, Line 12, and Line 13 of the Shanghai Metro, located in Jing'an District north of Suzhou Creek within the inner ring-road of Shanghai. On 19 December 2015, the interchange with Lines 12 and 13 opened. In February 2016 computerized light butterflies were added, and the government is also experimenting with videos on pillars.

Station Layout

Gallery

References

External links

Shanghai Metro stations in Jing'an District
Line 1, Shanghai Metro
Line 12, Shanghai Metro
Line 13, Shanghai Metro
Railway stations in China opened in 1995
Railway stations in Shanghai